Ko Shing Theatre, in Sheung Wan, Central and Western District, was Hong Kong's second indoor opera movie theatre.

The theatre was built in 1890 (other sources mention earlier dates). It was rebuilt and renovated several times and was finally demolished in 1973.

The former site of the Theatre, at 117 Queen's Road West, is part of the Central and Western Heritage Trail, Sheung Wan Route.

See also
 Lee Theatre
 Yau Ma Tei Theatre
 Cantonese opera
 List of cinemas in Hong Kong
 P&T Group

References

External links

 Ko Shing Theatre at cinematreasures.org

Theatres in Hong Kong
Cinemas in Hong Kong
Former cinemas
Demolished buildings and structures in Hong Kong
Sheung Wan
Buildings and structures demolished in 1973